Kuopio RC is a Finnish rugby club in Kuopio.

External links
Kuopio RC

Finnish rugby union teams
Kuopio